The 1963 Paris–Tours was the 57th edition of the Paris–Tours cycle race and was held on 6 October 1963. The race started in Paris and finished in Tours. The race was won by Jo de Roo.

General classification

References

1963 in French sport
1963
1963 Super Prestige Pernod
October 1963 sports events in Europe